Highway 123 is a highway in the Canadian province of Saskatchewan.

Highway 123 passes near the towns of Petaigan and Ravendale, and Pemmican Portage. Some provincial recreation sites also lie on Highway 123.

References

123